The MPM-10 (Montréal Pneumatic Material 2010), commonly known as the Azur, is the third and newest generation of rubber-tired rolling stock used on the Montreal Metro in Canada, built by a consortium of Bombardier Transportation and Alstom. The first MPM-10 train entered into service on the Orange Line in February 2016, replacing the entire first-generation MR-63 fleet. 71 nine-car trains have been built, and are currently in service on the Orange and Green Lines.

History 
By the mid-2000s, the original MR-63 Montreal Metro trains were around 40 years old, and maintenance costs were increasing. Société de transport de Montréal (STM) indicated that these trains would be replaced by modern rolling stock in the coming decade.

In May 2006, the Government of Quebec announced the negotiation of a $1.2 billion contract with Bombardier Transportation to replace the MR-63 fleet of 336 cars, then designated as MR-08. Trains were planned to enter service in the early 2010s. Alstom voiced its dismay over directly awarding the contract (to Bombardier) without a bidding process, noting that (like Bombardier) they would build new trains in Quebec. Negotiations between the STM and Bombardier were ongoing until 2007. The negotiations focused on the project's cost controls, terms of contract, train specifications and warranty. If negotiations had failed, the Quebec government and the STM would have reverted to a bidding process.

On 10 January 2008, Quebec Superior Court Judge Joel Silcoff rendered his decision regarding Alstom's filing of legal action against the Quebec government's Ministry of Transportation. The latter sought to bypass the bidding process, citing that Bombardier was the only domestic candidate capable of fulfilling the eventual contract. Silcoff ruled in favour of Alstom, enabling the company to bid on the contract.

As a consequence, the Government of Quebec decided to open the bidding process in February 2008, however this would delay delivery of the first trains by 9 to 12 months. In November 2008, Bombardier Transportation and Alstom announced that they would be submitting a joint bid to build the trains as a consortium.

In December 2009, CSR Zhuzhou Electric Locomotive expressed interest in bidding for the MR-08 contract citing a cheaper price than its competitors, and proposed an entirely steel-wheeled fleet of vehicles as opposed to the specified rubber-tired vehicles, citing advances in technology that gave steel wheels an advantage. CSR also proposed the construction of a factory in Quebec, creating up to 1,000 jobs and meeting the 60% Canadian content requirement. Spanish company CAF also expressed interest in the project, citing their experience in building rubber-tyred trains - and expressing concern about protectionism. However, the STM subsequently rejected both proposals.

Contract award 
Bombardier expected the first of the 468 cars to begin entering revenue service by February 2014, with deliveries continuing through 2018. Quebec would contribute 75% of the cost of the new trains, with Montréal providing the remainder.

In May 2012, STM announced that the name of the train would be Azur, following a public vote of shortlisted names. They stated that the name was "evocative of the intense shade of clear blue" throughout the system. In June 2012, the final design of the train was shown. In May 2013, the STM finished preparing the tunnels for the reception of the first test train.

Construction 
The train has a Canadian content of 60%, with production of the bogies taking place at Alstom's Sorel-Tracy plant to an adapted Paris Métro design, and final car assembly at Bombardier's La Pocatière plant. The first prototype train was unveiled in November 2013, and was delivered to Montreal in April 2014.

Tests of the prototype revealed several incompatibilities with Montréal's infrastructure, including insufficient electrical power. In January 2015 Bombardier suspended production for six months because of delays with the completion of the automated train control software. In January 2015, production of new Azurs was temporarily halted due to software installation and financing issues. As of April 2015, only 4 fully functional MPM-10 trains had been delivered to the STM, while 28 more cars had been assembled before production was halted. Bombardier blamed one of the subcontractors responsible for the automatic driving controls on the new trains for the delay. By the end of 2015, the issues were resolved and the trains remained on track to be completed by the 2018 deadline date.

Introduction into service 
After six months of vigorous testing, the first of the new cars entered revenue service at 10 am on February 7, 2016, departing from Henri-Bourassa station towards Côte-Vertu. The new trains were initially well received by the public.

On 14 January 2017, the STM removed all trainsets from circulation after finding unusual damage to the negative collector shoe due to unusual lateral forces being applied to the shoe and shoe mount. The trains were being brought back into service, starting January 28, 2017. On 14 August 2017, the first Azur deployed on the Green Line, for testing. This test phase aimed to "analyze the behavior of the train on this line, with the load that the customers on board the train". In October 2017, two Azur trains ran in service on the Green Line.

In February 2018, the Montreal Gazette confirmed that the Bombardier–Alstom consortium would deliver two free trainsets, as the first six trains were delivered late. By May 2018, 43 sets of Azur had been delivered. This effectively replaced the entire MR-63 fleet, which were retired in June 2018.

Additional order 
In May 2018, the STM announced that the Quebec government had allocated funds for an increase of the MPM-10 base order, to include an additional 17 nine-car trains (153 cars). This additional order would replace a portion of the MR-73 fleet, starting with the older and less reliable cars of that series. This would allow 90% of Green Line service to be provided by Azur trains. The contract option was agreed in November 2018, at a cost of $448 million. In December 2021, the final Azur train entered service, making a total of 71 nine-car sets delivered.

In service 
In September 2019, STM announced that straps for standing passengers would be installed in Azur trains, following feedback from passengers that the grab bars were too high. In 2020, STM announced that they would start displaying the occupancy and crowding levels of Azur cars on Metrovision platform screens. This would allow passengers to find quieter/less crowded parts of the train, allowing social distancing during the COVID-19 pandemic.

Specifications 

The MPM-10 Azur features full-width open-gangways between the cars which can be occupied by passengers, resulting in 8% more train capacity than previous trains.

The trains are equipped with an air suspension system, larger windows and wider doors. Wheelchair spaces are also provided, although the majority of Metro stations are not yet wheelchair-accessible. In the cabin, the trains also feature more natural lighting, high definition televisions, a new PA system and surveillance cameras. Improved ventilation is also featured; however, as with Montreal's previous generation rolling stock, cars are not air conditioned. Instead they are equipped with adjustable passenger force ventilation systems which deploy outside air into the train fast to create a cooler environment.

The MPM-10 uses Alstom OPTONIX IGBT–VVVF traction control assembled in the United States. The MPM-10 Azur can run faster than the maximum speed of the former MR-63, and the current MR-73 trains, they can run as fast as 100 km/h (62.1 mph) due to its enhanced motors. Given the higher capacity of the MPM-10, the trains are heavier than the outgoing MR-63s at 238 t (26.4 t per car).

Lines serviced

 Green Line (since 2017)

 Orange Line (since 2016)

Formation

Currently

See also 
 List of driverless trains

References

External links 

 STM New MPM-10 métro cars (pdf file)
 A new design for our new metro cars.mov
 Video of the new cars

Montreal Metro
Vehicles introduced in 2014
Alstom multiple units
Bombardier Transportation multiple units
750 V DC multiple units
Electric multiple units of Canada